The Electro-Spanish Model B was the world's first production, solid body (Bakelite) electrified lap steel guitar, officially released in 1935 by Rickenbacker.  Commercially, it was the most successful musical instrument manufactured by Rickenbacker.  Though not entirely solid - it had thick plastic (Bakelite) walls and a detachable Spanish neck.  The instrument was created to eliminate the feedback found in conventional electrification of stringed instruments.

The Electro-Spanish Model B set the stage for solid body guitars to develop; including the Fender Esquire in 1950 and the Gibson Les Paul in 1952.

References

Electric guitars
Rickenbacker guitars